Christen Brøgger (29 August 1925 – 8 September 2013) was a Danish footballer who played as a defender for Akademisk Boldklub. He played in 20 matches for the Denmark national team from 1952 to 1956.

References

External links
 
 

1925 births
2013 deaths
Danish men's footballers
Association football defenders
Denmark international footballers
Denmark youth international footballers
Denmark under-21 international footballers
Akademisk Boldklub players
Footballers from Copenhagen